Laureano Leone (born September 11, 1928) is a former politician in Ontario, Canada. He was a Liberal member of the Legislative Assembly of Ontario from 1987 to 1990.

Background
Leone was educated at Liceo Classico "Ovidio" of Sulmona in Abruzzo, and at the Detroit Institute of Technology. He also served as vice-chair of the Ontario Place Corporation, and as president of the National Congress of Italian Canadians and the Canadian Ethnocultural Council. He has received a Gold Medal (Award of Merit) from the city of Toronto for "community involvement", and was appointed as an Officer of the Order of Canada on April 22, 1982.

Politics
He ran for the Ontario legislature in the 1981 provincial election, but finished third against New Democrat Ed Philip in the riding of Etobicoke. He ran a second time in the riding of Downsview in the 1987 provincial election and defeated NDP candidate Maria Augimeri by 174 votes.  He served as a backbench supporter of David Peterson's government for the next three years.

The Liberals were defeated by the NDP in the 1990 provincial election. Leone's seat was a top NDP target, and he lost to NDP candidate Anthony Perruzza by over 5,000 votes.

Later life
Leone was later named an Honorary Consul of Canada in Sulmona, Italy.

References

External links
 

1928 births
Detroit Institute of Technology alumni
Italian emigrants to Canada
Living people
Ontario Liberal Party MPPs